The Flying Horse is a Grade II* listed public house at 6 Oxford Street, Marylebone in the City of Westminster. It was built in the 19th century, and is the last remaining pub on Oxford Street. The pub is on the Campaign for Real Ale's National Inventory of Historic Pub Interiors.

Known for a time as The Tottenham, it was renamed the Flying Horse in 2015, the pub's name prior to its redevelopment in 1894.

References

Grade II* listed buildings in the City of Westminster
Grade II* listed pubs in the City of Westminster
National Inventory Pubs
Fitzrovia
 
Oxford Street